Greenville Osborn McAlexander (January 15, 1871 – January 4, 1940) was an American politician who served as a member of the Virginia Senate. In 1905, he was the Republican nominee for the Virginia House of Delegates for Floyd and Franklin, but he lost to John R. Guerrant by a margin of 115 votes. He was elected to the Senate in 1907 and served one four-year term. He was named a Special Revenue Agent for Virginia, North Carolina, and Tennessee by President William Howard Taft.

References

External links

1871 births
1940 deaths
Republican Party Virginia state senators
20th-century American politicians